For the sigma N-transcription factor activator protein in prokaryotes, see NtrC

The National Transportation Research Center (NTRC) is an institution, located in Knoxville, Tennessee, that conducts research and development aimed at increasing the efficiency and safety of  transportation systems and reducing their energy utilization and effects on the environment.  

It is operated as a partnership between the United States Department of Energy, the University of Tennessee, and Oak Ridge National Laboratory (ORNL) and is located approximately halfway between the university campus and the ORNL site in Oak Ridge.

About two-thirds of the  NTRC building contains research laboratories.

External links
NTRC Official Web site

Transportation in the United States
Organizations based in Knoxville, Tennessee
Oak Ridge National Laboratory
Buildings and structures in Anderson County, Tennessee